Lindley Hall may refer to:

Places in the United Kingdom
The former Lindley Hall in Leicestershire, England, later the site of RAF Lindley and now the proving ground of the Motor Industry Research Association
Lindley Hall, London, one of the Royal Horticultural Halls 

Places in the United States
Lindley Hall at Ohio University, named for its first president, Jacob Lindley
The former Lindley Hall at Earlham College in Richmond, Indiana, designed by William S. Kaufman
The former Lindley Hall, first dormitory of the University of Idaho

See also
Lindley Hall Farm, one of the centre points of the United Kingdom
Linley Hall at Linley, Shropshire
Linley Hall at Talke, Staffordshire